Pradnya Daya Pawar, also known as Pradnya Lokhande, (born February 11, 1966), is an Indian poet and fiction writer of Marathi descent.

Pawar has been a member of the Maharashtra State Literary and Cultural Board. Recently she returned her state government awards in protest against what she believes is a rising atmosphere of intolerance and hate in India. A Buddhist, Pawar is the daughter of Daya Pawar.  

Pawar is editor of fortnightly Pariwartanacha Watsaru (परिवर्तनाचा वाटसरू)

Writings

Books of Poetry writings
 Antahstha (1993, 2004)
 Utkat Jiwaghenya Dhagiwar(2002)
 Mi Bhidawu Pahatey Samagrashi Dola (2007)
 Aarpaar Layit Pranantik (2009,2010)
 Drushyancha Dhobal Samudra (2013)

Other writings
 Dhadant Khairalanji, a 2007 play
 Kendra Ani Parigh, a 2004 collection of columns
 Mi Bhayankarachya Darwajyat Ubha Ahe – Namdeo Dhasal Yanchi Nivadak Kavita, a work co-edited with Satish Kalsekar, 2007
 Disha – Mahavidyalayin Kavi – Kavyitrinchya Kavita, a work co-edited with Nitin Rindhe, 2007
 Afawa Khari Tharawi Mhanun, a 2010 collection of short stories
 Tehaltikori, a 2016 collection of columns
 Arwachin Aaran, a 2020 collection of columns

Honors and awards
 Matoshree Bhimabai Ambedkar Award (2003)
Birsa Munda Rashtriya Sahitya Puraskar
Maharashtra Foundation Award
Shanta Shelke Award
Maharashtra State's Keshavsut, Balkavi and Indira Sant Vishesh Puraskar
Bodhivardhan Award
Maharashtra State's Ga.La.Thokal Vishesh Puraskar
Vanita Samaj Gaurav Puraskar
Presided over in various prestigious Literary Gatherings such as Gunijan Sammelan (2012, Aurangabad), Regional Sahitya Sammelan (2015, Patan, District Satara), Asmitadarsh Sammelan (2017, Latur), and Shikshak Sahitya Sammelan (2019, Virar, District Palghar).

References

Marathi-language poets
Living people
1966 births
Indian women poets
Dalit women writers
Dalit writers
20th-century Buddhists
21st-century Buddhists
Social workers from Maharashtra
Indian Buddhists